Cevheri is a quarter of the town Sungurlu, Sungurlu District, Çorum Province, Turkey. Its population is 262 (2022).

References

Populated places in Sungurlu District